Carlos Fermín Fitzcarrald López (6 July 1862 – 9 July 1897) was a Peruvian rubber baron. He was born in San Luis, Ancash.

Rubber baron
Fitzcarrald was the eldest son of an Irish-American sailor who later became a trader and married a Peruvian wife. He became established as a rubber baron in the late 19th century. Determined to find a way to transport rubber out of the Madre de Dios region, he exploited native workers. He forced them  under pain of death to dismantle and transport a ship over a mountain during the turn-of-the-20th-century rubber boom in the Amazon Basin.

Starting in 1894, he explored the Madre de Dios region of BAP Fitzcarrald in Lake Sandoval, Madre de Dios, Peru. He founded the City of Puerto Maldonado and explored the area that is now the Manu Biosphere Reserve. To achieve this, it was necessary to transport his steam ship piece by piece over the mountains to the Madre de Dios basin.

Fitzcarrald discovered a short passage overland between the Mishagua River, a tributary of the Urubamba, and the Manu, a tributary of the Madre de Dios River. The former leads into the Ucayali River. The Isthmus of Fitzcarrald was later named after him, as discovery of this route enabled transport of rubber from the Madre de Dios region. It was transferred to ships on the Mishagua, which could reach the Urubamba, the Ucayali River and thereby down the Amazon to markets and Atlantic ports for export.

His expeditions into the Madre de Dios region are considered to be the root of the modern-day divide between the local Yine and Mashco Piro peoples. The Yine are the descendants of the natives that Fitzcarrald forced to work for him, while the Mascho are the descendants of the natives that fled following Fitzcarrald's arrival. He died at age 35 together with his Bolivian business partner when their ship Contamana sank in Urubamba in an accident.

Legacy
 The Carlos Fermín Fitzcarrald Province was named after him.
 Puerto Maldonado has a place to view the sunken remains of Fitzcarrald's steam ship, the Contamana, which is located in the Madre de Dios River. 
 Fitzcarrald's disassembly and transport over a mountainous jungle land bridge, as well as his exploits inspired director and writer Werner Herzog's film Fitzcarraldo (1982), which symbolizes the extremes generated during the rubber boom, and takes Fitzcarrald's symbolic transport of a disassembled ship to an explicit hyperbole by dragging an entire steamboat over a mountain.

See also
Abuses against the Putumayo Indians
Roger Casement

References

1862 births
1897 deaths
People from Carlos Fermín Fitzcarrald Province
Peruvian people of American descent
Peruvian people of Irish descent
Peruvian businesspeople
Explorers of Amazonia
Deaths due to shipwreck